was a Fudai feudal domain under the Tokugawa shogunate of  Edo period Japan.  It was located in eastern Ōmi Province, in the Kansai region of central Honshu. The domain was centered at Mikami jin'ya, located in what is now the city of  Yasu in Shiga Prefecture.

History
The Endō clan ruled the 24,000 koku Gujō Domain in Mino Province from the start of the Tokugawa shogunate. On the death of Endō Tsuneharu, the retainers of the clan were divided by an O-Ie Sōdō over the succession, and when seven-year old Endō Tsuneharu died in 1693, the domain was dissolved due to attainder. However in light of the services the early Endō clan had given to Tokugawa Ieyasu, Shogun Tokugawa Tsunayoshi agreed to preserve the clan name, which was assigned to the eldest son of one of his hatamoto, Shirasu Tadayasu, who was married to the daughter of one of his concubines, Oden-no-kata. This son was assigned the name of "Endō Tanechika", and was raised by Toda Ujichika of Ogaki Domain. He was assigned an estate of 10,000 koku in Hitachi and Shimotsuke Provinces on reaching his maturity. In 1698, he was transferred to Ōmi Province. This marks the start of Mikami Domain.

The 5th daimyō, Endō Tanenori,  served as wakadoshiyori and supervised the reconstruction of the Nishi-no-maru enclosure of Edo Castle, for which he was awarded an increase in kokudaka to 12,000 koku. In 1860, he received a promotion in status allowing him to build a castle in place of his jin'ya, although no castle was actually built. His successor and final daimyō, Endō Taneki, was Bugyō over the Kōbusho (shogunal military academy) from 1863 and participated in the First Chōshū expedition of 1864. Under Tokugawa Yoshinobu he was appointed a sōshaban and was in the shogun's inner circle. For this reason, the nascent Meiji government regarded him as an enemy, and in January 1868 deprived of his domain. However, he was pardoned in May 1868 and installed as Imperial governor of Mikami in June. On July 1, 1870, he relocated his seat to Yoshimi in Izumi Province and the domain was officially renamed  during the final months before the abolition of the han system,

Bakumatsu period holdings
As with most domains in the han system, Mikami Domain consisted of a discontinuous territories calculated to provide the assigned kokudaka, based on periodic cadastral surveys and projected agricultural yields.

Izumi Province
8 villages in Izumi District
4 villages in Hine District

Ōmi Province
3 villages in Kurita District
2 villages in Yasu District
3 villages in  Kōka District

List of daimyō
  Endō clan (Fudai) 1698-1871

See also
List of Han

References
The content of this article was largely derived from that of the corresponding article on Japanese Wikipedia.

*

Notes

Domains of Japan
History of Shiga Prefecture
Ōmi Province